Jubilee College State Park is an Illinois state park located  west of Peoria, Illinois. It contains Jubilee College State Historic Site, a frontier Illinois college active from 1840 to 1862.

Jubilee College, and the frontier community that supported it, was founded in 1839 by Episcopal bishop Philander Chase.  Earlier in his career Chase had founded Kenyon College in Ohio.

This was one of the earliest educational enterprises in Illinois. After the Bishop's death, the college closed in 1862.

The entire Jubilee College site is still owned by the state of Illinois.  The  college grounds are operated by the Illinois Historic Preservation Agency (IHPA), and the surrounding  of open space are operated by the Illinois Department of Natural Resources (DNR).

The State of Illinois occasionally offers guided tours of the centerpiece of Jubilee College, the 1840s building that housed the school's Episcopal chapel, classrooms and dormitory facilities.  Restored in the 1970s, one wing contains the recreated schoolmaster's office and library, which also features a video theater and museum exhibits about the college.

The Jubilee College site was added to the National Register of Historic Places in 1972.

Though the state park is still open, the historic site was closed November 30, 2008.  Jubilee College State Historic Site, as well as 17 other historic sites and state parks, was closed by former Governor Rod Blagojevich to help close Illinois' multimillion-dollar budget deficit.  The park was reopened by Blagojevich's successor, Pat Quinn, but closed again on October 9, 2009.

However, the natural area surrounding the historic site, Jubilee College State Park contains multi-use trails maintained by volunteer user groups. The trails were originated by equestrians but are shared with hikers and mountain bikers. The state park also contains various camping areas, for which reservations are suggested.

References

External links

 
Mountain bike trails at Jubilee College State Park

State parks of Illinois
National Register of Historic Places in Peoria County, Illinois
Illinois State Historic Sites
Protected areas established in 1933 
Museums in Peoria County, Illinois
History museums in Illinois
Education museums in the United States
Protected areas of Peoria County, Illinois
University and college buildings on the National Register of Historic Places in Illinois
1933 establishments in Illinois